Jan De Nul Group is a Belgian family-owned company, with the financial headquarters in Luxembourg, that provides services relating to the construction and maintenance of maritime infrastructure on an international basis. Its main focus is dredging (including other forms of marine engineering), which accounts for 85% of its turnover. Other areas include civil engineering and environmental technology.

History 

Founded in 1938, in Hofstade near Aalst, Belgium, Jan De Nul started as a construction company specialised in civil works and maritime construction. It was only in 1951 that the company entered into the dredging business. Recently it has forayed into offshore wind business and have been successful in securing major European wind energy projects.

At the end of 2012, Jan De Nul had 6000 employees and a yearly turnover of 2 billion euro. Other major dredging companies are Dutch companies Royal Boskalis Westminster and Van Oord, and the Belgian DEME.

Jan De Nul was voted the most attractive employer in Belgium in 2008 and 2009.

Fleet
Jan De Nul has a fleet of 75 vessels, including 14 cutter suction dredgers, 28 trailing suction hopper dredgers, 20 split barges, 6 backhoe dredgers, 1 oil recovery vessel, 5 rock installation vessels and one cable installation vessel under construction. This includes the Cristobal Colon, launched in 2008, and the world's largest dredger with a capacity of 46,000 m³. It can dredge to a water depth of 155m. Joined by her near-sister ship Leiv Eiriksson in 2010, Jan De Nul has one of the world's largest, if not the largest, fleets of hopper dredgers.

Projects
Major projects realised in part or whole by Jan De Nul include the Panama Canal expansion project, the Bridgetown Port enhancement project, the Port Botany expansion, the Manifa Field Causeway and Island Project in Saudi Arabia, the Palm Jebel Ali artificial island in Dubai, and the adjacent Dubai Waterfront. The Takoradi Harbour expansion project in Ghana. In 2020-21 Jan De Nul Group installs a power inter-connector cable over a distance of 135 km and up to 1 km deep sea, connecting Crete island with mainland Greece.

Hijacked vessel
In April 2009, the Jan De Nul vessel "Pompei" was hijacked by Somali pirates en route from Aden to the Seychelles. The ship and its crew of ten were released after 71 days on 28 June 2009, after De Nul had paid 2.8 million Euros, according to media reports.

Notes

External links
Official site

Construction and civil engineering companies established in 1938
Construction and civil engineering companies of Belgium
Dredging companies
Companies based in East Flanders
Belgian companies established in 1938